The Mali women's national football team represents Mali in women's international football and is overseen by the Malian Football Federation, the governing body for football in Mali. They play their home matches at the Stade Modibo Kéïta, a multi-purpose stadium located in the city of Bamako.

Currently, Mali is ranked 85th in FIFA Women's World Rankings. They have never qualified for a FIFA Women's World Cup, but made a total of six appearances in the Africa Women Cup of Nations since the 2002 edition.

Team image

Home stadium
The Mali women's national football team plays their home matches on the Stade Modibo Kéïta.

Results and fixtures

The following is a list of match results in the last 12 months, as well as any future matches that have been scheduled.

Legend

2022

Coaching staff

Current coaching staff

Players

Current squad
 The following players were named for the 2022 Africa Women Cup of Nations qualification in February 2022.
 Caps and goals accurate up to and including 10 April 2021.

Recent call-ups
 The following players have been called up to the Mali squad in the past 12 months.

Records

 Active players in bold, statistics correct as of 2020.

Most capped players

Top goalscorers

Competitive record

FIFA Women's World Cup

Olympic Games

Africa Women Cup of Nations

African Games

Tournoi de Cinq Nations

WAFU Women's Cup record

Honours

All−time record against FIFA recognized nations
The list shown below shows the Djibouti national football team all−time international record against opposing nations.
*As of xxxxxx after match against  xxxx.
Key

Record per opponent
*As ofxxxxx after match against  xxxxx.
Key

The following table shows Djibouti's all-time official international record per opponent:

See also
Sport in Mali
Football in Mali
Women's football in Mali

References
Notes

Citations

External links
FIFA profile

 
African women's national association football teams